Benjamin Lloyd Stormont Mancroft, 3rd Baron Mancroft (born 16 May 1957), is a British peer, businessman and Conservative Party politician.

Early life
Mancroft was born on 16 May 1957. He is the son of the 2nd Baron Mancroft and Diana Lloyd. He was educated at Eton College, an all-boys public school in Berkshire.

Career
Between 1987 and 1998 Mancroft was Joint Master of the Vale of the White Horse Hunt and was chair of Addiction Recovery Foundation from 1989 to 2006 and patron until 2014. He was director of Phoenix House Housing Association from 1991 to 1996 and vice-chairman from 1992 to 1996. He was deputy chair of the British Field Sports Society from 1992 and 1997, President of the Alliance of Independent Retailers from 1996 to 2000 and chair of the Drug and Alcohol Foundation from 1994 to 2005. Director of Countryside Alliance 1997, vice-chair 2005, chair 2013– 2015. He has been chair of the Standing Conference on Countryside Sports & Wildlife Management since 2009 and chair of the Masters of FoxHounds Association since 2014. He has been president of the Lotteries Council since 2005. He also takes an active part in fox hunting.

Mancroft was chair of Inter Lotto (UK) Ltd from 1995 until 2004 and chair of Scratch-n-Win Lotteries from 1995 to 1998. He was director of St Martin's Magazines plc from 1995 to 2005 and director and vice chair of Rok Mobile Ltd from 2003 to 2007, Rok Corporation since 2003 and VP of Rok Mobile Inc 2007–2012. From 2006 to 2009 he was chair of New Media Lottery Services PLC, listed on AIM in 2006. He was director of DJI Holdings Ltd (PLC 2015) 2008–2016, chair 2008–2013, and director of BNN Technology PLC from 2015 (chair 2016–2017), chair PYX Financial Group 2013–2015 and chair Landtrader (UK & Ireland) Ltd from 2017.

Political career
In 1987 he succeeded to his father's titles and became the 3rd Baron Mancroft. He entered the House of Lords on 23 February 1988 and sits as a Conservative. In 1999 he was one of the ninety hereditary peers elected to remain in the House of Lords after the House of Lords Act 1999.

Personal life
Lord Mancroft has been married to Emma Peart, daughter of Thomas Peart and his wife Gabriel, since 20 September 1990; they have one daughter and two sons:

The Hon. Georgia Esmé Mancroft (born 25 April 1993)
The Hon. Arthur Louis Stormont Mancroft (born 3 May 1995)
The Hon. Maximilian Michael Mancroft (born 3 August 1998)

Arms

Controversies

NHS nurses controversy 
In February 2008, Mancroft claimed that NHS nurses who had treated him at the Royal United Hospital in Bath were "grubby, drunken and promiscuous". The hospital's Chief Executive, James Scott, called the accusations "damaging and distressing", and requested that the peer retract them. Mancroft met him but refused to apologise.

Hunting controversy 
In November 2020, Mancroft was involved in an online zoom webinar conspiring to actively flout the 2004 ban on hunting with hounds. At the end of the first seminar, Mancroft advises the audience: “Please take that on board everybody. Anything that comes out of these meetings is to be kept amongst ourselves it’s not for general coverage”. Mancroft was not charged; however, other co-conspirators were charged with “encouraging or assisting others to commit offences under the Hunting Act” following an investigation by the Devon and Cornwall Police.

Notes

References

1957 births
Living people
Politicians from London
People from Gloucestershire
British people of Jewish descent
British Ashkenazi Jews
People educated at Eton College
Barons in the Peerage of the United Kingdom
Conservative Party (UK) hereditary peers
20th-century British politicians
21st-century British politicians
Jewish British politicians
20th-century British businesspeople
21st-century British businesspeople
Masters of foxhounds in England
Hereditary peers elected under the House of Lords Act 1999